Grigory Kiselyov (30 August 1937 – 16 December 2000) was a Soviet swimmer. He competed in two events at the 1960 Summer Olympics.

References

1937 births
2000 deaths
Soviet male swimmers
Olympic swimmers of the Soviet Union
Swimmers at the 1960 Summer Olympics
Sportspeople from Smolensk
Universiade medalists in swimming
Universiade silver medalists for the Soviet Union